This is a list of now defunct airlines from Malawi.

See also

 List of airlines of Malawi
 List of airports in Malawi

References

Malawi
Airlines
Airlines, defunct